Sinza is an administrative ward in Ubungo District   of the Dar es Salaam Region, Tanzania. According to the 2002 census, the ward has a total population of 36,469.

References

Kinondoni District
Wards of Dar es Salaam Region